"Uncle Simon" is an episode of the American television anthology series The Twilight Zone. The episode explores people's willingness to wallow in misery and hate, through the example of a woman who submits herself to serving first her mean-spirited uncle, and later the robot he malevolently designed.

Opening narration

Plot
Barbara Polk has lived with her elderly, sadistic uncle Simon Polk for 25 years — even though she hates him — as she is the only heir to his fortune. Simon constantly harangues his niece, calling her various unflattering names and insulting her in creative ways. He uses a laboratory in the basement of his house to develop inventions, and has forbidden her from going down there to see his latest project, about which he drops malevolent hints. When she sneaks into the basement to peek at it, the two have a verbal altercation. Simon catches her and raises his cane to strike. Barbara blocks with her arm, causing him to fall down the stairs and break his back. Frustrated with his feebleness, nagging, and constant demands for hot chocolate, Barbara declines to assist and watches him lose his life.

Following Simon’s death, his lawyer Mr. Schwimmer reads the will to Barbara: to inherit his estate, she must live in the house and look after his last invention, a robot also named Simon. Although its behavior and speech are very mechanical at first, it engages in AI learning as time goes on.  It eventually acts and sounds just like him — right down to the old man’s limp, which it develops as a result of damage from Barbara’s attempt to destroy it by pushing it over backward. The robot repeats insults that Uncle Simon had programmed, berating Barbara as a “bovine crab” and “peanut-headed sample of nature’s carelessness.”  Since Mr. Schwimmer makes regular visits to ensure that Barbara is taking proper care of the robot, as per the stipulations of the will, she has no choice but to submit to its continuing verbal abuse and demands — including bringing it hot chocolate as she did for Simon — or risk being disinherited.

Closing narration

References
DeVoe, Bill. (2008). Trivia from The Twilight Zone. Albany, GA: Bear Manor Media. 
Grams, Martin. (2008). The Twilight Zone: Unlocking the Door to a Television Classic. Churchville, MD: OTR Publishing. 
Zicree, Marc Scott: The Twilight Zone Companion. Sillman-James Press, 1982 (second edition)

External links

1963 American television episodes
The Twilight Zone (1959 TV series season 5) episodes
Television episodes about robots
Television episodes written by Rod Serling